Melitaea balbita is a butterfly of the family Nymphalidae. It is found in Pakistan and the western Himalayas.

References

Butterflies described in 1874
Melitaea
Butterflies of Asia
Taxa named by Frederic Moore